Cape Verde competed in the Olympic Games for the first time at the 1996 Summer Olympics in Atlanta, United States.

Results by event

Athletics

Men 

Track and road events

Women 

Track and road events

References 

  (hosted by the LA84 Foundation)

Nations at the 1996 Summer Olympics
1996
Olympics